The Premier Volleyball League conference results present the final rankings of each conference in the Philippine Premier Volleyball League, formerly known as Shakey's V-League. The men's division became the Spikers' Turf in 2015 and later joined force to the Premier Volleyball League.

Women's Division

References

Conference Results